This is a list of recipients of the Jacques Parisot Foundation Fellowship awarded by World Health Organization (WHO).

The Foundation was founded in 1969 by Mrs Parisot in honour of Professor Jacques Parisot (1882–1967), who was a founding member of WHO and signed the Organization's Constitution on behalf of France at the 1946 International Health Conference in New York. The Foundation's goal is to promote social medicine or public health research by providing fellowships, which are given out every two years (even years). A bronze medal and a value of $5,000 USD make up the prize. It was discontinued in 2015.

List of recipients

See also 

 List of Ihsan Doğramacı Family Health Foundation Prize laureates
 List of Léon Bernard Foundation Prize laureates
 List of Sasakawa Health Prize laureates
 List of United Arab Emirates Health Foundation Prize laureates
 List of Sheikh Sabah Al-Ahmad Al-Jaber Al-Sabah Prize laureates
 List of Dr LEE Jong-wook Memorial Prize for Public Health laureates
 List of The State of Kuwait Prize for the Control of Cancer, Cardiovascular Diseases and Diabetes in the Eastern Mediterranean Region laureates
 List of Dr A.T. Shousha Foundation Prize and Fellowship laureates
 List of The Darling Foundation Prize laureates

References 

World Health Organization
Public health
WHO laureates